The 1992 Nigerian Senate election in Yobe State was held on July 4, 1992, to elect members of the Nigerian Senate to represent Yobe State. Umar El-Gash Maina representing Yobe North, Lawan Gana Giba representing Yobe East and Adamu Abubakar Nikar representing Yobe South all won on the platform of the Social Democratic Party.

Overview

Summary

Results

Yobe North 
The election was won by Umar El-Gash Maina of the Social Democratic Party.

Yobe East 
The election was won by Lawan Gana Giba of the Social Democratic Party.

Yobe South 
The election was won by Adamu Abubakar Nikar of the Social Democratic Party.

References 

Yob
Yobe State Senate elections
July 1992 events in Nigeria